Meredith Leroy Sanford Jr. (born December 24, 1966) is an American former professional baseball pitcher for the Cincinnati Reds, Colorado Rockies, and Minnesota Twins.

Career
Sanford pitched five games for Cincinnati in August 1991 recording eight strikeouts in his debut against the San Diego Padres, but was not in the majors in 1992.  He was selected by Colorado with the 62nd pick in the 1992 expansion draft, and appeared in 11 games, starting six, in the Rockies' inaugural season.  After a season in the minors, Sanford pitched 11 games in relief for Minnesota in 1995.

External links

Pura Pelota (Venezuelan Winter League)

1966 births
Living people
Alabama Crimson Tide baseball players
American expatriate baseball players in Mexico
Baseball players from Georgia (U.S. state)
Cedar Rapids Reds players
Chattanooga Lookouts players
Cincinnati Reds players
Colorado Rockies players
Colorado Springs Sky Sox players
Gulf Coast Reds players
Greensboro Hornets players
Major League Baseball pitchers
Massachusetts Mad Dogs players
Mexican League baseball pitchers
Minnesota Twins players
Nashville Sounds players
Oklahoma City 89ers players
People from Americus, Georgia
Rieleros de Aguascalientes players
Salt Lake Buzz players
Schaumburg Flyers players
Tiburones de La Guaira players
American expatriate baseball players in Venezuela
Starkville High School alumni
American expatriate baseball players in Taiwan
Brother Elephants players
African-American baseball players